Sergio Javier Migliaccio Magliano (born 3 June 1974) is a Uruguayan football manager and former player who played as a goalkeeper. He is the current goalkeeping coach of Bolivian side Jorge Wilstermann.

External links
 
 

1974 births
Living people
Uruguayan footballers
Uruguayan expatriate footballers
Categoría Primera A players
Club Atlético River Plate (Montevideo) players
Liverpool F.C. (Montevideo) players
Montevideo Wanderers F.C. players
Sud América players
Rocha F.C. players
Miramar Misiones players
Central Español players
Boyacá Chicó F.C. footballers
Provincial Osorno footballers
Cobresal footballers
C.A. Rentistas players
Expatriate footballers in Chile
Expatriate footballers in Peru
Expatriate footballers in Colombia
Association football goalkeepers
Uruguayan football managers
Bolivian Primera División managers
C.D. Jorge Wilstermann managers
Uruguayan expatriate football managers
Uruguayan expatriate sportspeople in Bolivia
Expatriate football managers in Bolivia